Julián Sánchez Pimienta (born 26 February 1980 in Zafra) is a Spanish former professional road bicycle racer.

Major results 

2006
 3rd Overall Vuelta a Mallorca
 2nd Trofeo Pollença
2007
 2nd Prueba Villafranca de Ordizia
2009
Volta a Catalunya
1st Stage 4
1st Mountains classification

External links 

1980 births
Living people
People from Zafra
Sportspeople from the Province of Badajoz
Spanish male cyclists
Cyclists from Extremadura